WNEV (98.7 FM) is a radio station licensed to Friars Point, Mississippi. The station broadcasts a Blues format and is owned by L.T. Simes II & Raymond Simes.

References

External links
WNEV's official website

Blues radio stations
NEV
Friars Point, Mississippi